Strathmere is an unincorporated community and census-designated place (CDP) located within Upper Township in Cape May County, New Jersey, United States. As of the 2020 United States census, the CDP's population was 137, a decrease of 21 (-13.3%) from the 158 counted at the 2010 U.S. census, which reflected a decrease of 17 (-9.7%) from the 175 enumerated at the 2000 census.

With its beaches in the Strathmere section, Upper Township is one of five municipalities in the state that offer free public access to oceanfront beaches monitored by lifeguards, joining Atlantic City, North Wildwood, Wildwood, and Wildwood Crest.

History
The earliest known people on Ludlam Island (where Strathmere is located) were the Lenape Native Americans, who came to the island in the summertime to hunt fish and crustaceans. Along the northern  portion of the island was a community named Corson's Inlet, after the waterway separating the island and Ocean City to the north. A part of Upper Township and Dennis Township became a part of neighboring Sea Isle City in 1905, also on Ludlam Island. That same year, Sea Isle City sold Corson's Inlet to Upper Township for $31,500 (equivalent to $ in ) to pay off municipal debt. In 1912, the community of Corson's Inlet was renamed Strathmere.

The Whale Beach section of Strathmere got its name from the whales that would periodically beach themselves there.

In 2007, Citizens for Strathmere and Whale Beach petitioned to leave Upper Township and join neighboring Sea Isle City, citing an unfair tax burden, inadequate municipal services, and a lengthy wait time for the police. The local planning board held 18 meetings over the next two years, and the township recommended against de-annexation in 2009, noting that taxes would increase school taxes by 20% for the remainder of Upper Township. The group in favor of de-annexation filed a suit with the New Jersey Superior Court, which ruled against the petition in 2010. An appeal to the New Jersey Supreme Court was denied in January 2013.

Geography
According to the United States Census Bureau, the CDP had a total area of 0.760 square miles (1.968 km2), including 0.598 square miles (1.549 km2) of land and 0.162 square miles (0.419 km2) of water (21.29%).

Demographics

Census 2010

Census 2000
As of the 2000 United States census there were 175 people, 93 households, and 54 families residing in the CDP. The population density was 104.0/km2 (269.6/mi2). There were 464 housing units at an average density of 275.6/km2 (714.7/mi2). The racial makeup of the CDP was 97.71% White, 1.14% Asian, and 1.14% from two or more races. Hispanic or Latino of any race were 1.71% of the population.

Of the 93 households; 7.5% had children under the age of 18 living with them, 49.5% were married couples living together, 5.4% had a female householder with no husband present, and 40.9% were non-families. 38.7% of all households were made up of individuals, and 12.9% had someone living alone who was 65 years of age or older. The average household size was 1.88 and the average family size was 2.44.

In the CDP the population was spread out, with 8.0% under the age of 18, 4.0% from 18 to 24, 17.1% from 25 to 44, 36.6% from 45 to 64, and 34.3% who were 65 years of age or older. The median age was 58 years. For every 100 females, there were 96.6 males. For every 100 females age 18 and over, there were 96.3 males.

The median income for a household in the CDP was $78,709, and the median income for a family was $77,783. Males had a median income of $40,972 versus $43,750 for females. The per capita income for the CDP was $52,045. None of the population or families were below the poverty line.

Climate
According to the Köppen climate classification system, Strathmere has a humid subtropical climate (Cfa) with hot, moderately humid summers, cool winters and year-around precipitation. Cfa climates are characterized by all months having an average mean temperature > , at least four months with an average mean temperature ≥ , at least one month with an average mean temperature ≥  and no significant precipitation difference between seasons. During the summer months in Strathmere, a cooling afternoon sea breeze is present on most days, but episodes of extreme heat and humidity can occur with heat index values ≥ . During the winter months, episodes of extreme cold and wind can occur with wind chill values < .

Ecology
According to the A. W. Kuchler U.S. potential natural vegetation types, Strathmere, New Jersey would have a dominant vegetation type of Northern Cordgrass (73) with a dominant vegetation form of Coastal Prairie (20).

Education
As with other parts of Upper Township, the area is zoned to Upper Township School District (for grades K-8) and Ocean City School District (for high school). The latter operates Ocean City High School.

Countywide schools include Cape May County Technical High School and Cape May County Special Services School District.

References

External links
 Strathmere web site
 The Upper Township Gazette serving Strathmere Local community newspaper

Census-designated places in Cape May County, New Jersey
Jersey Shore communities in Cape May County
Upper Township, New Jersey